The ABC Wasp was an experimental 170 hp (127 kW) seven-cylinder radial engine designed by the noted British engineer Granville Bradshaw, and primarily built by ABC Motors Limited. An order for twelve experimental ABC Wasp engines was placed with Guy Motors on 19 April 1918. Eight ABC Wasp engines were made by Crossley Motors Ltd of Manchester, England.

Design and development
The ABC Wasp was one of the first large non-rotary air-cooled radials. At a weight of 290 pounds (131 kg), it had a reasonable power-to-weight ratio at 0.6 horsepower per pound. This World War I–era engine is noteworthy because it was one of the first in which the cylinders were coated with copper in an attempt to dissipate heat. The ABC Wasp never evolved beyond the experimental stage, but it was the predecessor of the unsuccessful Dragonfly engine.

Variants
Wasp I
1918, 160 hp (119 kW) 
Wasp II
1919, 200 hp (149 kW)

Applications
Wasp I
Avro 504K
BAT Bantam
BAT Baboon
Sopwith Snail
Westland Wagtail

Wasp II
Avro 504K
BAT Bantam
Saunders Kittiwake
Sopwith Snail
Westland Wagtail

Specifications (Wasp I)

See also

References

Notes

Bibliography

 
 Lumsden, Alec. British Piston Engines and their Aircraft. Marlborough, Wiltshire: Airlife Publishing, 2003. .

 

1910s aircraft piston engines
Wasp
Aircraft air-cooled radial piston engines